CJNS-FM is a Canadian radio station that broadcasts a country format at 102.3 FM in Meadow Lake, Saskatchewan. CJNS is owned by the Jim Pattison Group.

The station provides some 30 hours of local programming a week, 6 hours per day, Monday to Friday. The remainder of the programming continues to originate from, and is basically a satellite of, CJNB in North Battleford. Its radio studio is at 225 Centre Street in Meadow Lake.

CJNS originally began broadcasting in 1977 as an AM radio station at 1240 on the AM dial, until it moved to FM in 2004.

References

External links
Jim Pattison Radio Stations
102.3 CJNS
 

Radio-Locator info on CJNS

Jns
Meadow Lake, Saskatchewan
Jns